Oliva obesina is a species of sea snail, a marine gastropod mollusk in the family Olividae, the olives.

Description
The length of the shell attains 44 mm.

Distribution
This marine species occurs off the Tonga Islands and Japan.

References

 Chenu, 1844 Parts 33-34. In Illustrations Conchyliologiques ou description et figures de toutes les coquilles connues vivantes et fossiles, classées suivant le système de Lamarck modifié d'après les progrès de la science et comprenant les genres nouveaux et les espèces récemment découvertes, p. Oliva pp 21-28 ; Strombus pl 8, 4, 28, 30, 12, 18 ; Pecten pl 24, 6, 54, 55 ; Serpula pl; 5, 6
 Duclos P.L. (1844-1848). Oliva. In J.C. Chenu, Illustrations conchyliologiques ou description et figures de toutes les coquilles connues vivantes et fossiles, classées suivant le système de Lamarck modifié d'après les progrès de la science et comprenant les genres nouveaux et les espèces récemment découvertes: 5-28
 Chenu, 1845 - Parts 44. In Illustrations Conchyliologiques ou description et figures de toutes les coquilles connues vivantes et fossiles, classées suivant le système de Lamarck modifié d'après les progrès de la science et comprenant les genres nouveaux et les espèces récemment découvertes, p. Tridacna pp 1, 2 ; Oliva pl 34, 4, 12, 26, 30, 33
 Vervaet F.L.J. (2018). The living Olividae species as described by Pierre-Louis Duclos. Vita Malacologica. 17: 1-111

External links
 MNHN. Paris: syntype

obesina